Cerace sardias is a species of moth of the family Tortricidae. It is found in Assam, India.

The wingspan is 40–42 mm. The forewings are bright yellow, the base with a bluish-black shining streak. The hindwings are bright yellow, the apical part dull brownish black.

References

Moths described in 1907
Ceracini